The Hulk is a superhero appearing in American comic books published by Marvel Comics. Created by writer Stan Lee and artist Jack Kirby, the character first appeared in the debut issue of The Incredible Hulk (May 1962). In his comic book appearances, the character, who has dissociative identity disorder (DID), is primarily represented by the alter ego Hulk, a green-skinned, hulking and muscular humanoid possessing a limitless degree of physical strength, and the alter ego Dr. Robert Bruce Banner, a physically weak, socially withdrawn, and emotionally reserved physicist, both of whom typically resent each other.

Following his accidental exposure to gamma rays while saving the life of Rick Jones during the detonation of an experimental bomb, Banner is physically transformed into the Hulk when subjected to emotional stress, at or against his will. This transformation often leads to destructive rampages and to conflicts that complicate Banner's civilian life. The Hulk's level of strength is normally conveyed as proportionate to his level of anger. Commonly portrayed as a raging savage, the Hulk has been represented with other alter egos, from a mindless, destructive force (War), to a brilliant warrior (World-Breaker), a self-hating protector (the Devil/Immortal), a genius scientist in his own right (Doc Green), and a gangster (Joe Fixit). It is later revealed Banner's DID formed from being abused by his father Brian as a child and that the alter egos known as Fixit and the Devil/Immortal Hulk originally manifested during his childhood, with a malevolent identity embodying his guilt, shame, and regret towards his father (based on him) manifesting as the Guilt.

Despite both Hulk and Banner's desire for solitude, the character has a large supporting cast. This includes Banner's ex-wife Betty Ross, his best friend Rick Jones, his cousin She-Hulk, and therapist and ally Doc Samson. In addition, the Hulk alter ego has many key supporting characters, like his co-founders of the superhero team the Avengers, his queen Caiera, fellow warriors Korg and Miek, and sons Skaar and Hiro-Kala. However, his uncontrollable power has brought him into conflict with his fellow heroes and others. Despite this, he tries his best to do what's right while battling villains such as the Leader, the Abomination, the Absorbing Man and more.

Lee stated that the Hulk's creation was inspired by a combination of Frankenstein and Dr. Jekyll and Mr. Hyde. Although the Hulk's coloration has varied throughout the character's publication history, the most usual color is green.

One of the most iconic characters in popular culture, the character has appeared on a variety of merchandise, such as clothing and collectable items, inspired real-world structures (such as theme park attractions), and been referenced in a number of media. Banner and the Hulk have been adapted in live-action, animated, and video game incarnations. The character was first played in live-action by Bill Bixby and Lou Ferrigno in the 1978 television series The Incredible Hulk and its subsequent television films The Incredible Hulk Returns (1988), The Trial of the Incredible Hulk (1989), and The Death of the Incredible Hulk (1990), then by Eric Bana in the film Hulk (2003). In the Marvel Cinematic Universe (MCU), the character was first portrayed by Edward Norton in the film The Incredible Hulk (2008) and then by Mark Ruffalo in The Avengers (2012), Iron Man 3 (2013), Avengers: Age of Ultron (2015), Thor: Ragnarok (2017), Avengers: Infinity War (2018), Captain Marvel (2019), Avengers: Endgame (2019), Shang-Chi and the Legend of the Ten Rings (2021), the television series She-Hulk: Attorney at Law (2022), and the animated series What If...? (2021), where Ruffalo reprised the role.

Publication history

Concept and creation
The Hulk first appeared in The Incredible Hulk #1 (cover dated May 1962), written by writer-editor Stan Lee, penciled and co-plotted by Jack Kirby, and inked by Paul Reinman. Lee cites influence from Frankenstein and Dr. Jekyll and Mr. Hyde in the Hulk's creation:

Kirby, commenting upon his influences in drawing the character, recalled as inspiration witnessing in person the hysterical strength of a mother lifting a car off her trapped child.

Lee has also compared Hulk to the Golem of Jewish mythology. In The Science of Superheroes, Gresh and Weinberg see the Hulk as a reaction to the Cold War and the threat of nuclear attack, an interpretation shared by Weinstein in Up, Up and Oy Vey. This interpretation corresponds with other popularized fictional media created during this time period, which took advantage of the prevailing sense among Americans that nuclear power could produce monsters and mutants.

In the debut, Lee chose grey for the Hulk because he wanted a color that did not suggest any particular ethnic group. Colorist Stan Goldberg, however, had problems with the grey coloring, resulting in different shades of grey, and even green, in the issue. After seeing the first published issue, Lee chose to change the skin color to green. Green was used in retellings of the origin, with even reprints of the original story being recolored for the next two decades, until The Incredible Hulk vol. 2, #302 (December 1984) reintroduced the grey Hulk in flashbacks set close to the origin story. An exception is the early trade paperback, Origins of Marvel Comics, from 1974, which explains the difficulties in keeping the grey color consistent in a Stan Lee-written prologue, and reprints the origin story keeping the grey coloration. Since December 1984, reprints of the first issue have displayed the original grey coloring, with the fictional canon specifying that the Hulk's skin had initially been grey.

Lee gave the Hulk's alter ego the alliterative name "Bruce Banner" because he found he had less difficulty remembering alliterative names. Despite this, in later stories he misremembered the character's name and referred to him as "Bob Banner", an error which readers quickly picked up on. The discrepancy was resolved by giving the character the official full name "Robert Bruce Banner."

The Hulk got his name from a comic book character named The Heap who was a large green swamp monster.

Series history
The Hulk's original series was canceled with issue #6 (March 1963). Lee had written each story, with Kirby penciling the first five issues and Steve Ditko penciling and inking the sixth. The character immediately guest-starred in The Fantastic Four #12 (March 1963), and months later became a founding member of the superhero team the Avengers, appearing in the first two issues of the team's eponymous series (Sept. and Nov. 1963), and returning as an antagonist in issue #3 and as an ally in #5 (Jan.–May 1964). He then guest-starred in Fantastic Four #25–26 (April–May 1964), which revealed Banner's full name as Robert Bruce Banner, and The Amazing Spider-Man #14 (July 1964).

Around this time, co-creator Kirby received a letter from a college dormitory stating the Hulk had been chosen as its official mascot. Kirby and Lee realized their character had found an audience in college-age readers.

A year and a half after The Incredible Hulk was canceled, the Hulk became one of two features in Tales to Astonish, beginning in issue #60 (Oct. 1964).

This new Hulk feature was initially scripted by Lee, with pencils by Steve Ditko and inks by George Roussos. Other artists later in this run included Jack Kirby (#68–87, June 1965 – Oct. 1966); Gil Kane (credited as "Scott Edwards", #76, (Feb. 1966)); Bill Everett (#78–84, April–Oct. 1966); John Buscema (#85–87); and Marie Severin. The Tales to Astonish run introduced the super-villains the Leader, who would become the Hulk's nemesis, and the Abomination, another gamma-irradiated being. Marie Severin finished out the Hulk's run in Tales to Astonish. Beginning with issue #102 (April 1968) the book was retitled The Incredible Hulk vol. 2, and ran until 1999, when Marvel canceled the series and launched Hulk #1. Marvel filed for a trademark for "The Incredible Hulk" in 1967, and the United States Patent and Trademark Office issued the registration in 1970.

Len Wein wrote the series from 1974 through 1978, working first with Herb Trimpe, then, as of issue #194 (December 1975), with Sal Buscema, who was the regular artist for ten years. Issues #180–181 (Oct.–Nov. 1974) introduced Wolverine as an antagonist, who would go on to become one of Marvel Comics' most popular characters. In 1977, Marvel launched a second title, The Rampaging Hulk, a black-and-white comics magazine. This was originally conceived as a flashback series, set between the end of his original, short-lived solo title and the beginning of his feature in Tales to Astonish. After nine issues, the magazine was retitled The Hulk! and printed in color.

In 1977, two Hulk television films were aired to strong ratings, leading to an Incredible Hulk TV series that aired from 1978 to 1982. A huge ratings success, the series introduced the popular Hulk catchphrase "Don't make me angry. You wouldn't like me when I'm angry", and broadened the character's popularity from a niche comic book readership into the mainstream consciousness.

Bill Mantlo became the series' writer for five years beginning with issue #245 (March 1980). Mantlo's "Crossroads of Eternity" stories (#300–313 (Oct. 1984 – Nov. 1985)) explored the idea that Banner had suffered child abuse. Later Hulk writers Peter David and Greg Pak have called these stories an influence on their approaches to the character. Mantlo left the series for Alpha Flight and that series' writer John Byrne took over The Incredible Hulk. The final issue of Byrne's six issue run featured the wedding of Bruce Banner and Betty Ross. Writer Peter David began a 12-year run with issue #331 (May 1987). He returned to the Roger Stern and Mantlo abuse storylines, expanding the damage caused, and depicting Banner as suffering dissociative identity disorder (DID).

In 1998, David killed off Banner's long-time love Betty Ross. Marvel executives used Ross' death as an opportunity to pursue the return of the Savage Hulk. David disagreed, leading to his parting ways with Marvel. Also in 1998, Marvel relaunched The Rampaging Hulk as a standard comic book rather than as a comics magazine. The Incredible Hulk was again cancelled with issue #474 of its second volume in March 1999 and was replaced with a new series, Hulk the following month, with returning writer Byrne and art by Ron Garney. New series writer Paul Jenkins developed the Hulk's multiple dissociative identities, and his run was followed by Bruce Jones with his run featuring Banner being pursued by a secret conspiracy and aided by the mysterious Mr. Blue. Jones appended his 43-issue Incredible Hulk run with the limited series Hulk/Thing: Hard Knocks #1–4 (Nov. 2004 – Feb. 2005), which Marvel published after putting the ongoing series on hiatus. Peter David, who had initially signed a contract for the six-issue Tempest Fugit limited series, returned as writer when it was decided to make that story the first five parts of the revived (vol. 3). After a four-part tie-in to the "House of M" storyline and a one-issue epilogue, David left the series once more, citing the need to do non-Hulk work for the sake of his career.

Writer Greg Pak took over the series in 2006, leading the Hulk through several crossover storylines including "Planet Hulk" and "World War Hulk", which left the Hulk temporarily incapacitated and replaced as the series' title character by the demigod Hercules in the retitled The Incredible Hercules (Feb. 2008). The Hulk returned periodically in Hulk, which then starred the new Red Hulk. In September 2009, The Incredible Hulk was relaunched as The Incredible Hulk (vol. 2) #600. The series was retitled The Incredible Hulks with issue #612 (Nov. 2010) to encompass the Hulk's expanded family, and ran until issue #635 (Oct. 2011) when it was replaced with The Incredible Hulk (vol. 3) (15 issues, Dec. 2011 – Dec. 2012) written by Jason Aaron with art by Marc Silvestri. As part of Marvel's 2012 Marvel NOW! relaunch, a series called The Indestructible Hulk (Nov. 2012) debuted under the creative team of Mark Waid and Leinil Yu. This series was replaced in 2014 with The Hulk by Waid and artist Mark Bagley.

A new series titled Immortal Hulk, written by Al Ewing and drawn by Joe Bennett, was launched in 2018 and ran for 50 issues. The series had a spin-off one-shot Immortal She-Hulk and a spin-off series about Gamma Flight in June 2021.

In November 2021, Donny Cates became the new writer of Hulk, with Ryan Ottley joining as artist. In May 2022, the series did a crossover with the Thor series, also written by Cates, entitled Hulk vs Thor: Banner of War.

Fictional character biography
During the experimental detonation of a gamma bomb, scientist Robert Bruce Banner saves teenager Rick Jones who has driven onto the testing field; Banner pushes Jones into a trench to save him, but is hit with the blast, absorbing massive amounts of gamma radiation. He awakens later seemingly unscathed, but that night transforms into a lumbering grey form. A pursuing soldier dubs the creature a "hulk". Originally, it was believed that Banner's transformations into the Hulk were caused by sunset and undone at sunrise, but later, after Rick witnessed Banner turn into Hulk at daytime following a failed attempt by Ross' men to shoot the Hulk into space, it was discovered to be caused by anger. Banner was cured in The Incredible Hulk #4, but chose to restore Hulk's powers with Banner's intelligence. The gamma-ray machine needed to affect the transformation-induced side effects that made Banner temporarily sick and weak when returned to his normal state.

In The Avengers #1 (September 1963), the Hulk became a founding member of the title's eponymous superhero team. By The Avengers #3, overuse of the gamma-ray machine rendered the Hulk as an uncontrollable, rampaging monster, subject to spontaneous changing. In Tales to Astonish #59 (September 1964) the Hulk appeared as an antagonist for Giant-Man. The series established stress as the trigger for Banner turning into the Hulk and vice versa. It was during this time that the Hulk developed a more savage and childlike identity, shifting away from his original portrayal as a brutish but not entirely unintelligent figure. Also, his memory, both long-term and short-term, would now become markedly impaired in his Hulk state. Tales to Astonish #64 (February 1965) was the last Hulk story to feature him speaking in complete sentences. In Tales to Astonish #77 (March 1966), Banner's and the Hulk's dual identity became publicly known when Rick Jones, mistakenly convinced that Banner was dead (when he actually had been catapulted into the future), told Major Glenn Talbot, a rival to Banner for the affections of Betsy Ross, the truth. Consequently, Glenn informed his superiors and that turned Banner into a wanted fugitive upon returning to the present.

The 1970s saw Banner and Betty nearly marry in The Incredible Hulk #124 (February 1970). Betty ultimately married Talbot in issue #158 (Dec. 1972). The Hulk also traveled to other dimensions, one of which had him meet empress Jarella, who used magic to bring Banner's intelligence to the Hulk, and came to love him. The Hulk helped to form the Defenders.

In the 1980s, Banner once again gained control over the Hulk, and gained amnesty for his past rampages; however, due to the manipulations of supernatural character Nightmare, Banner eventually lost control over the Hulk. It was also established that Banner had serious mental problems even before he became the Hulk, having suffered childhood traumas that engendered Bruce's repressed rage. Banner comes to terms with his issues for a time, and the Hulk and Banner were physically separated by Doc Samson. Banner is recruited by the U.S. government to create the Hulkbusters, a government team dedicated to catching the Hulk. Banner finally married Betty in The Incredible Hulk #319 (May 1986) following Talbot's death in 1981. Banner and the Hulk were reunited in The Incredible Hulk #323 (Sep. 1986) and with issue #324, returned the Hulk to his grey coloration, with his transformations once again occurring at night, regardless of Banner's emotional state. In issue #347 the grey Hulk persona "Joe Fixit" was introduced, a morally ambiguous Las Vegas enforcer and tough guy. Banner remained repressed in the Hulk's mind for months, but slowly began to reappear.

The 1990s saw the Green Hulk return. In issue #377 (Jan. 1991), the Hulk was revamped in a storyline that saw the various dissociative identities of Banner, Fixit, and Savage confront Banner's past abuse at the hands of his father Brian and a new "Guilt" identity. Overcoming the trauma, the intelligent Banner, cunning Fixit, and powerful Savage identities merge into a new single entity possessing the traits of all three. The Hulk also joined the Pantheon, a secretive organization of superpowered individuals. His tenure with the organization brought the Hulk into conflict with a tyrannical alternate future version of himself called the Maestro in the 1993 Future Imperfect miniseries, who rules over a world where many heroes are dead.

In 2000, Banner and the three Hulks (Savage, Fixit, and the "Merged Hulk", now considered a separate identity and referred to as the Professor) become able to mentally interact with one another, each identity taking over the shared body as Banner began to weaken due to his suffering from Lou Gehrig's disease. During this, the four identities (including Banner) confronted yet another submerged identity, a sadistic "Devil" intent on attacking the world and attempting to break out of Banner's fracturing psyche, but the Devil was eventually locked away again when the Leader was able to devise a cure for the disease using genes taken from the corpse of Brian Banner. In 2005, it is revealed that the Nightmare has manipulated the Hulk for years, and it is implied that some or all of the Hulk's adventures written by Bruce Jones may have been just an illusion.

In 2006, the Illuminati decide the Hulk is too dangerous to remain on Earth and send him away by rocket ship which crashes on Planet Sakaar ushering in the "Planet Hulk" storyline that saw the Hulk find allies in the Warbound, and marry alien queen Caiera, a relationship that was later revealed to have born him two sons: Skaar and Hiro-Kala. After the Illuminati's ship explodes and kills Caiera, the Hulk returns to Earth with his superhero group Warbound and declares war on the planet in World War Hulk (2007). However, after learning that Miek, one of the Warbound, had actually been responsible for the destruction, the Hulk allows himself to be defeated, with Banner subsequently redeeming himself as a hero as he works with and against the new Red Hulk to defeat the new supervillain team the Intelligencia.

In the 2010s, Hiro-Kala traveled to Earth to destroy the OldStrong Power wielded by Skaar, forcing Skaar and the Hulk to defeat and imprison him within his home planet.

During the 2011 Fear Itself storyline, the Hulk finds one of the Serpent's magical hammers associated with the Worthy and becomes Nul: Breaker of Worlds. As he starts to transform, the Hulk tells the Red She-Hulk to run far away from him. Rampaging through South and Central America, Nul was eventually transported to New York City where he began battling Thor, with aid of the Thing, who was transformed into Angrir: Breaker of Souls. After defeating the Thing, Thor stated that he never could beat the Hulk, and instead removed him from the battle by launching him into Earth orbit, after which Thor collapsed from exhaustion. Landing in Romania, Nul immediately began heading for the base of the vampire-king Dracula. Opposed by Dracula's forces, including a legion of monsters, Nul was seemingly unstoppable. Only after the intervention of Raizo Kodo's Forgiven was Nul briefly slowed. Ultimately, Nul makes his way to Dracula's castle where the timely arrival of Kodo and Forgiven member Inka, disguised as Betty Ross, is able to throw off the effects of the Nul possession. Throwing aside the hammer, the Hulk regains control, and promptly leaves upon realizing "Betty's" true nature.

With the crisis concluded, the Hulk contacted Doctor Doom for help separating him and Banner for good in return for an unspecified favor. Doom proceeded to perform brain surgery on the Hulk, extracting the uniquely Banner elements from the Hulk's brain and cloning a new body for Banner. When Doctor Doom demands to keep Banner for his own purposes, the Hulk reneges on the deal and flees with Banner's body, leaving his alter ego in the desert where he was created to ensure that Doctor Doom cannot use Banner's intellect. When Banner goes insane due to his separation from the Hulk, irradiating an entire tropical island trying to recreate his transformation- something he cannot do as the cloned body lacks the genetic elements of Banner that allowed him to process the gamma radiation- the Hulk is forced to destroy his other side by letting him be disintegrated by a gamma bomb, prompting the Hulk to accuse Doom of tampering with Banner's mind, only for Doom to observe that what was witnessed was simply Banner without the Hulk to use as a scapegoat for his problems. Initially assuming that Banner is dead, the Hulk soon realizes that Banner was somehow "re-combined" with him when the gamma bomb disintegrated Banner's body, resulting in the Hulk finding himself waking up in various strange locations, including helping the Punisher confront a drug cartel run by a mutated dog, hunting sasquatches with Kraven the Hunter, and being forced to face Wolverine and the Thing in an old SHIELD base. Banner eventually leaves a video message for the Hulk in which he apologizes for his actions while they were separate, having come to recognize that he is a better person with the Hulk than without, the two joining forces to thwart the Doombots' attempt to use the animals on Banner's irradiated island as the basis for a new gamma army using a one-of-a-kind gamma cure Banner had created to turn all the animals back to normal. Following this, Bruce willingly joined the spy organization S.H.I.E.L.D., allowing them to use the Hulk as a weapon in exchange for providing him with the means and funding to create a lasting legacy for himself.

After the Hulk had suffered brain damage upon being shot in the head by the Order of the Shield- the assassin having been carefully trained to target Bruce at just the right part of the brain to incapacitate him without triggering a transformation- Iron Man used the Extremis to cure the Hulk. This procedure also increased Banner's mental capacity, which gave him the intelligence to tweak the Extremis virus within him and unleash a new persona for the Hulk: the super-intelligent Doc Green.

During the 2014 "Original Sin" storyline, Bruce Banner confronted by the eye of the murdered Uatu the Watcher. Bruce temporarily experienced some of Tony Stark's memories of their first meeting before either of them became the Hulk or Iron Man. During this vision, Bruce witnessed Tony modifying the gamma bomb to be more effective prompting Bruce to realize that Tony was essentially responsible for him becoming the Hulk in the first place. Subsequent research reveals that Tony's tampering had actually refined the bomb's explosive potential so that it would not disintegrate everyone within the blast radius, with the result that Tony's actions had actually saved Bruce's life.

In the 2014 "AXIS" storyline, when a mistake made by the Scarlet Witch causes various heroes and villains to experience a moral inversion, Bruce Banner attended a meeting between Nick Fury Jr. and Maria Hill of S.H.I.E.L.D. and the Avengers who refused to turn over Red Skull. Later when he sided with Edwin Jarvis and tried to prevent his teammates from executing the Red Skull, the Hulk was thrown aside by Luke Cage. The Hulk's sorrow at his friends' betrayal awakened a new persona known as the bloodthirsty Kluh (described as the Hulk's Hulk, being the ruthless part of himself that even the Hulk repressed) with this new version easily defeating the Avengers, sneering that the Hulk they knew was nothing more than a "sad piece of 'Doc Green's' ID." Kluh then leaves to wreak havoc, with Nova attempting to stop him after witnessing his rampage with the remaining good heroes. As with the other inverted Avengers and X-Men, Kluh was restored to Hulk when Brother Voodoo was summoned back to life by Doctor Doom so that Daniel Drumm's ghost can possess the Scarlet Witch and undo the inversion.

With his newfound intellect, Doc Green came to the conclusion that the world was in danger by Gamma Mutates and thus needed to be depowered. He developed a serum made from Adamantium nanobites that absorbed gamma energy. He used these to depower Red Leader, Red She-Hulk, Red Hulk, Skaar, Gamma Corps, and A-Bomb, but decided to 'spare' She-Hulk as he concluded that she was the one gamma mutation whose life had been legitimately improved by her mutation. At the close of the storyline, Doc Green discovered that he was beginning to disappear as the result of the Extremis serum wearing off. He ultimately allowed himself to fade away, returning to his normal Hulk form, as he feared that remaining at his current intellectual level would lead to him becoming the Maestro.

During the 2015 "Secret Wars" storyline, the Hulk took part in the incursion between Earth-616 and Earth-1610. The Hulk used the "Fastball Special" with Colossus to destroy the Triskelion.

As part of the 2015–2018 All-New, All-Different Marvel branding, Amadeus Cho becomes the new Hulk. Flashbacks reveal that the Hulk had absorbed a dangerous new type of radiation while helping Iron Man and the Black Panther deal with a massive accident on Kiber Island. Fearing the Hulk's meltdown would kill countless innocents, Cho was able to use special nanites to absorb the Hulk from Banner and take it into himself to become his own version of the Hulk, leaving Banner normal and free from the Hulk. He is then rescued from a bar fight by Amadeus, who tells him that he is cured. Having confirmed that he can no longer transform or sense the Hulk, Bruce spends some time traveling across America taking various risks such as driving at high speeds, running away from a bear, or gambling in Las Vegas, until he is confronted by Tony Stark out of concern that Bruce has a death wish. Bruce instead acknowledges that he still harbors guilt and rage over how so many of the Hulk's rampages were provoked by various agencies refusing to leave him alone.

During the 2016 "Civil War II" storyline, the vision of the Inhuman Ulysses shows a rampaging Hulk standing over the corpses of the superheroes. Meanwhile, Bruce Banner is shown to have set up a laboratory in Alpine, Utah, where he is approached by Captain Marvel, followed by Tony Stark, the rest of the Avengers, the X-Men, and the Inhumans. The confrontation leads to the Beast hacking into Banner's work servers and the revelation that he had been injecting himself with dead gamma-irradiated cells. S.H.I.E.L.D. Director Maria Hill places him under arrest. Banner gets infuriated at all these events, when suddenly, Hawkeye shoots Banner with an arrow to the head and then to the heart, killing him, much to the dismay and horror of the superheroes, especially Tony Stark. At an Avengers-presided tribunal, Hawkeye states that Bruce Banner had approached him and ordered him to kill him if he ever showed signs of turning into the Hulk again. At the funeral, Korg of the Warbound stated how Hulk wanted to be left alone and how his allies that he made along the way have become his family. In his video will, Bruce leaves various items to other heroes and his allies including leaving Doctor Strange his notes on the Hulk's ability to perceive ghosts and an egg-timer for the various former/current other Hulks (based on one of Bruce's more successful attempts to control himself as he would sit down for three minutes doing nothing before making a particularly big decision and then decide if he still wanted to do it).

Following the funeral of Bruce Banner, the Hand in allegiance with Daniel Drumm's ghost steal Bruce Banner's body in order to use the dead to bolster their ranks. When the reassembled Uncanny Avengers went to Japan and attempted to enlist Elektra for help in stopping the Hand, the ritual that the Hand performed has been completed as the Uncanny Avengers are attacked by a revived Hulk who is wearing samurai armor. The Uncanny Avengers were able to contain Hulk's rampage and sever his mystical link to the Beast of the Hand. Afterward, Hulk regressed back to Bruce Banner and returned to the dead.

During the 2017 "Secret Empire" storyline, Arnim Zola used an unknown method to temporarily revive Bruce Banner, and the Hydra Supreme version of Captain America persuades his Hulk side to attack the Underground's hideout called the Vault. He fought Thing and Giant-Man's A.I.Vengers until the temporary revival started to wear off and caused Hulk to die again.

During the "No Surrender" arc, the exiled Elder of the Universe Challenger revives Hulk to be his ace in the hole during a contest between his Black Order and Grandmaster's Lethal Legion. Hulk participated since he knew that Earth will be destroyed either way while his Bruce Banner suspects that Hulk's revivals were a manifestation of Hulk's immortality. While defeating Cannonball and Living Lightning, breaking Vision, and draining the gamma energy out of Robert Maverick's Hulk Plug-In, Wonder Man successfully reasoned with him as Hulk destroyed the Pyarmoid in Voyager's possession. After feeling remorse for what happened, Bruce Banner became Hulk and faced off against Challenger. After Challenger sent Hulk into Earth's orbit, Hulk was pleased that he managed to hurt Challenger.

While maintaining a low profile, Bruce Banner was shot by Tommy Hill of the Dogs of Hell biker gang during a robbery that also claimed the lives of Sandy Brockhurst and Josh Alfaro. He came back to life and turned into Hulk where he badly beat up Tommy Hill. The witnesses in the Dogs of Hell told Detective Gloria Mayes of the attacker as she and reporter Jackie McGee have a suspicion that it was Hulk even though Banner is believed to be dead.

During the events of "Absolute Carnage," the Venom Symbiote takes Bruce as its host to fight Carnage. Inside of Bruce's mind, Bruce converses with the Venom Symbiote as the other Hulk identities such as Joe Fixit and Savage add their opinions about their current situation. Devil (in his more traditional-looking reptilian form) is against the symbiote's presence in Bruce and says it should be removed immediately, saying they have more important matters to deal with. In the end, Bruce, Fixit, and Savage agree to collaborate with the Venom Symbiote and Devil storms off, saying they are making a mistake. As Bruce states that the vote is three to one with two abstentions, he welcomes the Venom symbiote to the family.

Alternative versions of Hulk

A number of alternate universes and alternate timelines in Marvel Comics publications allow writers to introduce variations on the Hulk, in which the character's origins, behavior, and morality differ from the mainstream setting. In some stories, someone other than Bruce Banner is the Hulk.

In some versions, the Hulk succumbs to the darker side of his nature: in "Future Imperfect" (December 1992), a future version of the Hulk has become the Maestro, the tyrannical and ruthless ruler of a nuclear war-irradiated Earth, and in "Old Man Logan" (2008), an insane Hulk rules over a post-apocalyptic California and leads a gang of his inbred Hulk children created with his first cousin She-Hulk.

Characterization 
Like other long-lived characters, the Hulk's character and cultural interpretations have changed with time, adding or modifying character traits. The Hulk is typically seen as a hulking man with green skin, hair, and eyes, wearing only a pair of torn purple pants that survive his physical transformation as the character progressed. As Bruce Banner, the character is about 5 ft 9 in (1.75 m) tall and weighs 128 lbs (58.05 kg), but when transformed into the Hulk, the character stands between 7 and 8 ft (2.13 - 2.43 m) tall and weighs between 1,040 and 1,400 lbs (471.73 - 635.02 kg). The Gray Hulk stands 6 ft 6 in (1.98 m) tall and weighs 900 lbs (408.23 kg); the Merged Hulk stands 7 ft 6 in (2.28 m) tall and weighs 1,150 lbs (521.63 kg); the Green Scar stands 8 ft 8 in (2.64 m) tall and weighs 2,400 lbs (1.08 ton). The Immortal Hulk is roughly the same size as Sasquatch, standing around 9 or 10 ft (2.74 / 3.04 m) tall and weighing roughly 2,000 lbs (907.18 kg). Following his debut, Banner's transformations were triggered at nightfall, turning him into a grey-skinned Hulk. In Incredible Hulk #2, the Hulk started to appear with green skin, and in Avengers #3 (1963) Banner realized that his transformations were now triggered by surges of adrenaline in response to feelings of fear, pain or anger. Incredible Hulk #227 (1978) established that the Hulk's separate identity was not due to the mutation affecting his brain, but because Banner was suffering from dissociative identity disorder, with the savage Green Hulk representing Banner's repressed childhood rage and aggression, and the Grey Hulk representing Banner's repressed selfish desires and urges.

Identities

Bruce Banner
During his decades of publication, Banner has been portrayed differently, but common themes persist. Banner, a physicist who earned his Ph.D. in nuclear physics from the California Institute of Technology (Caltech), is sarcastic and seemingly very self-assured when he first appears in Incredible Hulk #1, but is also emotionally withdrawn. Banner designed the gamma bomb that caused his affliction, and the ironic twist of his self-inflicted fate has been one of the most persistent common themes. Arie Kaplan describes the character thus: "Robert Bruce Banner lives in a constant state of panic, always wary that the monster inside him will erupt, and therefore he cannot form meaningful bonds with anyone." As a child, Banner's father Brian often got mad and physically abused both Banner and his mother, creating the psychological complex of fear, anger, and the fear of anger and the destruction it can cause that underlies the character. Banner has been shown to be emotionally repressed, but capable of deep love for Betty Ross, and for solving problems posed to him. Under the writing of Paul Jenkins, Banner was shown to be a capable fugitive, applying deductive reasoning and observation to figure out the events transpiring around him. On the occasions that Banner controlled the Hulk's body, he applied principles of physics to problems and challenges and used deductive reasoning. It was shown after his ability to turn into the Hulk was taken away by the red Hulk that Banner has been extremely versatile as well as cunning when dealing with the many situations that followed. When he was briefly separated from the Hulk by Doom, Banner became criminally insane, driven by his desire to regain the power of the Hulk, but once the two recombined he came to accept that he was a better person with the Hulk to provide something for him to focus on controlling rather than allowing his intellect to run without restraint against the world.

Hulk
The original Hulk was shown as grey and average in intelligence. He roamed aimlessly and became annoyed at "puny" humans who took him for a dangerous monster. Shortly after becoming the Hulk, his transformation continued turning him green, coinciding with him beginning to display primitive speech.  By Incredible Hulk #4, radiation treatments gave Banner's mind complete control of the Hulk's body. While Banner relished his indestructibility and power, he was quick to anger and more aggressive in his Hulk form. He became known as a hero alongside the Avengers, but his increasing paranoia caused him to leave the group. He was convinced that he would never be trusted.

Originally, the Hulk was shown as simple-minded and quick to anger. The Hulk generally divorces his identity from Banner's, decrying Banner as "puny Banner." From his earliest stories, the Hulk has been concerned with finding sanctuary and quiet.  He is often shown to quickly react emotionally to situations. Grest and Weinberg call Hulk the "dark, primordial side of Banner's psyche." Even in the earliest appearances, Hulk spoke in the third person. Hulk retains a modest intelligence, thinking and talking in full sentences. Lee even gives the Hulk expository dialogue in issue #6, allowing readers to learn just what capabilities Hulk has, when the Hulk says, "But these muscles ain't just for show! All I gotta do is spring up and just keep goin'!" In the 1970s, Hulk was shown as more prone to anger and rage, and less talkative. Writers played with the nature of his transformations, briefly giving Banner control over the change, and the ability to maintain control of his Hulk form. Artistically and conceptually, the character has become progressively more muscular and powerful in the years since his debut.

Joe Fixit
Originally, Stan Lee wanted the Hulk to be grey. Due to ink problems, Hulk's color was changed to green. This was later changed in the story to indicate that the grey Hulk and the savage Hulk are separate dissociative identities or entities fighting for control in Bruce's subconscious. The Grey Hulk incarnation can do the more unscrupulous things that Banner could not bring himself to do, with many sources comparing the grey Hulk to the moody teenager that Banner never allowed himself to be. While the grey Hulk still had the-madder-he-gets, the-stronger-he-gets part that is similar to the savage Hulk, it is on a much slower rate. It is said by the Leader that the grey Hulk is stronger on nights of the new moon and weaker on nights of the full moon. Originally, the night is when Bruce Banner became the Grey Hulk and changed back by dawn. In later comics, willpower or stress would have Banner turn into the grey Hulk. During one storyline where he was placed under a spell to prevent him turning back into Bruce Banner and publicly presumed dead when he was teleported away from a gamma bomb explosion that destroyed an entire town, the grey Hulk adopted a specific name as Joe Fixit, a security guard for a Las Vegas casino owner, with the grey Hulk often being referred to as Joe after these events. Joe Fixit later gained the ability to transform into his version of Red Hulk form when in the Below-Place.

Doc Green
Convinced that unaided, the Banner, Green Hulk, and Grey Hulk identities would eventually destroy each other, Doc Samson uses hypnosis to merge the three to create a new single identity combining Banner's intelligence with the Grey Hulk's and Banner's attitudes and the Green Hulk's body. This new Merged Hulk, Professor Hulk, or simply The Professor, considered himself cured and began a new life, but the merger was not perfect, and the Hulk sometimes still considered Banner a separate person, and when overcome with rage the Merged Hulk would transform back into Banner's human body while still thinking himself the Hulk. The Merged Hulk is the largest of the three primary Hulk incarnations. While in a calm emotional state, the Merged Hulk is stronger than Savage Hulk when he is calm. Unlike the Savage Hulk and the Grey Hulk, Banner subconsciously installed a type of safeguard within this incarnation. The safeguard is that when the Merged Hulk gets angry, he regresses back to Banner with the mind of the Savage Hulk.

Ultimately, of the Merged Hulk identity takes on the name 'Doc Green as the result of Extremis fixing Hulk's brain, becoming powerful enough to destroy Tony Stark's mansion with one thunderclap.

The Devil/Immortal
The Devil Hulk or Immortal Hulk, or simply the Devil or Immortal, is the result of the Hulk needing a father figure. While the character's physical appearance varies, he is always depicted as having glowing red eyes and reptilian traits. The new form of the Devil Hulk is the result of Banner and Hulk having been through different deaths and rebirths. This incarnation is articulate, smart, and cunning, and does merciless attacks on those who do harm. Unlike the other Hulk incarnations, the Devil Hulk is content with waiting inside Bruce. If Bruce is injured by sunset, the Devil Hulk will emerge with his transformation being limited to night-time. Thanks to the Devil Hulk side and Banner working together, the Devil Hulk can maintain his form in sunlight.

Other identities
The Gravage Hulk is the result of Banner using the Gamma Projector on himself which merged his Savage Hulk and Grey Hulk identities. This form possesses the raw power of the Savage Hulk and the cunning intellect of the Grey Hulk. While he does not draw on anger to empower him, the Gravage Hulk identity draws on dimensional nexus energies to increase his strength.

The Dark Hulk identity is the result of Hulk being possessed by Shanzar. This form has black skin and is viciously strong.

The Guilt Hulk is a malevolent representation of Banner's abusive father, Brian Banner, that manifests itself in Banner's childhood memories.

The Green Scar identity is unleashed on Sakaar and is an enraged version of the Gravage Hulk. In addition, he is an expert in armed combat like the use of swords and shields. Green Scar is also a capable leader and an expert strategist.

Titan is a more monstrous and malicious form of Hulk who stands at 30 ft., has black skin, rock-like spikes on his shoulders, and possesses the ability to shoot lasers from his eyes.

Powers and abilities

Bruce Banner 
Considered to be one of the greatest scientific minds on Earth, Banner possesses "a mind so brilliant it cannot be measured on any known intelligence test." Norman Osborn estimates that he is the fourth most-intelligent person on Earth. Banner holds expertise in biology, chemistry, engineering, medicine, physiology, and nuclear physics. Using this knowledge, he creates advanced technology dubbed "Bannertech", which is on par with technological development from Tony Stark or Doctor Doom. Some of these technologies include a force field that can protect him from the attacks of Hulk-level entities, and a teleporter.

After becoming a fugitive from the law, Banner is forced to go on the run and over the years learns various skills in order to both survive and remain under radar of those who are hunting him. Banner’s most frequent method of travel includes hitchhiking, train hopping or simply just walking as he is unable to travel legally via planes, passenger ships or buses due to being in several travel watchlists. Banner is generally on the move and rarely ever stays in one place for very long and only does so if there’s a possibility of curing himself. He will only ever stay in one place for an extended period of time if it provides him with complete solitude and privacy where the Hulk can do little to no harm.   

To avoid being tracked, Banner does not use cell phones, debit or credit cards and will only use payphone’s or cash. He will often use fake identities when staying at motels or working jobs that require identification. Having been on the run for years, Banner can normally tell when he is being followed and will generally make a run for it when he is discovered. Having traveled across the globe, Banner is able to sneak over borders without being detected and can get by, by either knowing or learning the local language. Often traveling light, Banner has little to no possessions that he carries in either a satchel or backpack. Often losing everything he owns after transforming into the Hulk, Banner avoids keeping anything of personal value to him so that he can easily replace the items and clothes that were lost or destroyed.  

To support himself financially, Banner will work quick part time jobs and will only accept payments in cash. These jobs have varied from simply working in low pay diners to working as local doctor. Banner’s work ethic as well as his vast knowledge and skillset in science, medicine and engineering often help him get hired rather quickly. Unless desperate, Banner will generally avoid jobs that are high stress due to the potential danger of transforming into the Hulk. 

During his travels, Banner has developed several different techniques to help suppress or control his transformations when he becomes a little angry or upset. Among the techniques he’s learned over the years include meditation and hypnotherapy. While they have helped him to better understand and suppress his transformations, none of techniques Banner has learned have helped him to gain full control over the Hulk.

The Hulk 
The Hulk possesses the potential for seemingly limitless physical strength that is influenced by his emotional state, particularly his anger. This has been reflected in the repeated comment "The madder Hulk gets, the stronger Hulk gets." The cosmically powerful entity known as the Beyonder once analyzed the Hulk's physiology, and claimed that the Hulk's potential strength had "no finite element inside." Hulk's strength has been depicted as sometimes limited by Banner's subconscious influence; when Jean Grey psionically "shut Banner off", Hulk became strong enough to overpower and destroy the physical form of the villain Onslaught. Writer Greg Pak described the Worldbreaker Hulk shown during World War Hulk as having a level of physical power where "Hulk was stronger than any mortal—and most immortals—who ever walked the Earth" and depicted the character as powerful enough to completely destroy entire planets. His strength allows him to leap into lower Earth orbit or across continents, and he has displayed superhuman speed. Exposure to radiation has also been shown to make the Hulk stronger. It is unknown how he gains biomass during transformation but it may be linked to the One-Below-All.

His durability, regeneration, and endurance also increase in proportion to his temper. Hulk is resistant to injury or damage, though the degree to which varies between interpretations, but he has withstood the equivalent of solar temperatures, nuclear explosions, and planet-shattering impacts. Despite his remarkable resiliency, continuous barrages of high-caliber gunfire can hinder his movement to some degree while he can be temporarily subdued by intense attacks with chemical weapons such as anesthetic gases, although any interruption of such dosages will allow him to quickly recover. He has been shown to have both regenerative and adaptive healing abilities, including growing tissues to allow him to breathe underwater, surviving unprotected in space for extended periods, and when injured, healing from most wounds within seconds, including, on one occasion, the complete destruction of most of his body mass. His future self, the "Maestro", was even eventually able to recover from being blown to pieces. As an effect, he has an extremely prolonged lifespan.

He also possesses less commonly described powers, including abilities allowing him to "home in" to his place of origin in New Mexico; resist psychic control, or unwilling transformation; grow stronger from radiation or dark magic; punch his way between separate temporal or spatial dimensions; and to see and interact with astral forms. Some of these abilities were in later years explained as being related; his ability to home in on the New Mexico bomb site was due to his latent ability to sense astral forms and spirits, since the bomb site was also the place where the Maestro's skeleton was and the Maestro's spirit was calling out to him in order to absorb his radiation. He is also shown to have a separate memory to Bruce Banner - when Spider-Man has the knowledge of his secret identity erased during Spider-Man: One More Day, the Hulk later asks how Peter is doing, not Spider-Man; upon questioning, he enigmatically states "Banner forgot. But I don't forget."

In the first Hulk comic series, "massive" doses of gamma rays would cause the Hulk to transform back to Banner, although this ability was written out of the character by the 1970s.

Supporting characters

Over the long publication history of the Hulk's adventures, many recurring characters have featured prominently, including his best friend and sidekick Rick Jones, love interest and wife Betty Ross and her father, the often adversarial General "Thunderbolt" Ross. Both Banner and Hulk have families created in their respective personas. Banner is son to Brian, an abusive father who killed Banner's mother while she tried to protect her son from his father's delusional attacks, and cousin to Jennifer Walters, the She-Hulk, who serves as his frequent ally. Banner had a stillborn child with Betty, while the Hulk has two sons with his deceased second wife Caiera Oldstrong, Skaar and Hiro-Kala, and his DNA was used to create a daughter named Lyra with Thundra the warrior woman.

The Fantastic Four #12 (March 1963), featured the Hulk's first battle with the Thing. Although many early Hulk stories involve Ross trying to capture or destroy the Hulk, the main villain is often a radiation-based character, like the Gargoyle or the Leader, along with other foes such as the Toad Men, or Asian warlord General Fang. Ross' daughter Betty loves Banner and criticizes her father for pursuing the Hulk. General Ross' right-hand man, Major Glenn Talbot, also loves Betty and is torn between pursuing Hulk and trying to gain Betty's love more honorably. Rick Jones serves as the Hulk's friend and sidekick in these early tales. The Hulk's archenemies are the Abomination and the Leader. The Abomination is more monstrous-looking, twice as strong as the Hulk at normal levels (however, the Abomination's strength levels do not increase when he gets angry) and wreaks havoc for fun and pleasure. The Leader is a super-genius who has tried plan after plan to take over the world.

Cultural impact

The Hulk character and the concepts behind it have been raised to the level of iconic status by many within and outside the comic book industry. In 2003, Official U.S. PlayStation Magazine claimed the character had "stood the test of time as a genuine icon of American pop culture." In 2008, the Hulk was listed as the 19th greatest comic book character by Wizard magazine. Empire magazine named him as the 14th-greatest comic-book character and the fifth-greatest Marvel character. In 2011, the Hulk placed No. 9 on IGN's list of "Top 100 Comic Book Heroes", and fourth on their list of "The Top 50 Avengers" in 2012.

Analysis
The Hulk is often viewed as a reaction to war. As well as being a reaction to the Cold War, the character has been a cipher for the frustrations the Vietnam War raised, and Ang Lee said that the Iraq War influenced his direction. In the Michael Nyman edited edition of The Guardian, Stefanie Diekmann explored Marvel Comics' reaction to the September 11 attacks. Diekmann discussed The Hulk's appearance in the 9/11 tribute comic Heroes, claiming that his greater prominence, alongside Captain America, aided in "stressing the connection between anger and justified violence without having to depict anything more than a well-known and well-respected protagonist." In Marvel: Five Fabulous Decades of the World's Greatest Comics, Les Daniels addresses the Hulk as an embodiment of cultural fears of radiation and nuclear science. He quotes Jack Kirby thus: "As long as we're experimenting with radioactivity, there's no telling what may happen, or how much our advancements in science may cost us." Daniels continues, "The Hulk became Marvel's most disturbing embodiment of the perils inherent in the atomic age."

In Comic Book Nation, Bradford Wright alludes to Hulk's counterculture status, referring to a 1965 Esquire magazine poll amongst college students which "revealed that student radicals ranked Spider-Man and the Hulk alongside the likes of Bob Dylan and Che Guevara as their favorite revolutionary icons." Wright goes on to cite examples of his anti-authority symbol status. Two of these are "The Ballad of the Hulk" by Jerry Jeff Walker, and the Rolling Stone cover for September 30, 1971, a full color Herb Trimpe piece commissioned for the magazine. The Hulk has been caricatured in such animated television series as The Simpsons, Robot Chicken, and Family Guy, and such comedy TV series as The Young Ones. The character is also used as a cultural reference point for someone displaying anger or agitation. For example, in a 2008 Daily Mirror review of an EastEnders episode, a character is described as going "into Incredible Hulk mode, smashing up his flat." In September 2019, British Prime Minister Boris Johnson likened himself to The Hulk in an interview with the Mail On Sunday, as political pressure built on him to request an extension to the date of the UK's withdrawal from the European Union.

The Hulk, especially his alter ego Bruce Banner, is also a common reference in hip hop music. The term was represented as an analogue to marijuana in Dr. Dre's 2001, while more conventional references are made in Ludacris and Jermaine Dupri's popular single "Welcome to Atlanta".

The 2003 Ang Lee-directed Hulk film saw discussion of the character's appeal to Asian Americans. The Taiwanese-born Ang Lee commented on the "subcurrent of repression" that underscored the character of The Hulk, and how that mirrored his own experience: "Growing up, my artistic leanings were always repressed—there was always pressure to do something 'useful,' like being a doctor." Jeff Yang, writing for the San Francisco Chronicle, extended this self-identification to Asian American culture, arguing that "the passive-aggressive streak runs deep among Asian Americans—especially those who have entered creative careers, often against their parents' wishes."

There have been explorations about the real-world possibility of Hulk's gamma-radiation-based origin. In The Science of Superheroes, Lois Grest and Robert Weinberg examined Hulk's powers, explaining the scientific flaws in them. Most notably, they point out that the level of gamma radiation Banner is exposed to at the initial blast would induce radiation sickness and kill him, or if not, create significant cancer risks for Banner, because hard radiation strips cells of their ability to function. They go on to offer up an alternate origin, in which a Hulk might be created by biological experimentation with adrenal glands and GFP. Charles Q. Choi from LiveScience.com further explains that, unlike the Hulk, gamma rays are not green; existing as they do beyond the visible spectrum, gamma rays have no color at all that we can describe. He also explains that gamma rays are so powerful (the most powerful form of electromagnetic radiation and 10,000 times more powerful than visible light) that they can even convert energy into matter – a possible explanation for the increased mass that Bruce Banner takes on during transformations. "Just as the Incredible Hulk 'is the strongest one there is,' as he says himself, so too are gamma-ray bursts the most powerful explosions known."

Other Marvel Comics characters called the Hulk
Prior to the debut of the Hulk in May 1962, Marvel had earlier monster characters that used the name the "Hulk", but had no direct relation.

 In Strange Tales #75 (June 1960), Albert Poole built an armor he called the Hulk. In modern-day reprints, the character's name was changed to Grutan.
 In Journey into Mystery #62 (Nov. 1960) was Xemnu the Living Hulk, a huge, furry alien monster went by the name of the Hulk. Coincidentally, the character's debut story was also illustrated by Jack Kirby. The character reappeared in issue #66 (March 1961). Since then the character has been a mainstay in the Marvel Universe, and was renamed Xemnu the Living Titan.
 A huge, orange, slimy monster called the Hulk was featured in a movie titled The Hulk in Tales to Astonish #21 (July 1961). In modern-day reprints, the character's name was changed to the Glop.

In other media 

The character was first played in live-action by Bill Bixby and Lou Ferrigno in the 1978 television series The Incredible Hulk and its subsequent television films The Incredible Hulk Returns (1988), The Trial of the Incredible Hulk (1989), and The Death of the Incredible Hulk (1990), then by Eric Bana in the film Hulk (2003). In the Marvel Cinematic Universe (MCU), the character was first portrayed by Edward Norton in the film The Incredible Hulk (2008) and then by Mark Ruffalo in The Avengers (2012), Iron Man 3 (2013), Avengers: Age of Ultron (2015), Thor: Ragnarok (2017), Avengers: Infinity War (2018), Captain Marvel (2019), Avengers: Endgame (2019), Shang-Chi and the Legend of the Ten Rings (2021), the television series She-Hulk: Attorney at Law (2022), and the animated series What If...? (2021), where Ruffalo reprised the role.

Reception
The Hulk was ranked #1 on a listing of Marvel Comics' monster characters in 2015.

In 2018, CBR.com ranked The Thing (Bruce Banner) 2nd in their "Age Of Apocalypse: The 30 Strongest Characters In Marvel's Coolest Alternate World" list.

In 2022, Screen Rant included Hulk in their "10 Most Powerful Hercules Villains In Marvel Comics" list.

See also
 List of Marvel Comics superhero debuts

References

External links

 
 
 
 
 Hulk on IMDb
 

Avengers (comics) characters
Hulk (comics)
Characters created by Jack Kirby
Characters created by Stan Lee
Comics adapted into television series
Comics by Jack Kirby
Comics by Stan Lee
Comics by Steve Ditko
Comics characters introduced in 1962
Fictional characters from New Mexico
Fictional characters from Ohio
Fictional attempted suicides
Fictional California Institute of Technology people
Fictional characters with dissociative identity disorder
Fictional characters with nuclear or radiation abilities
Fictional characters with superhuman durability or invulnerability
Fictional fugitives
Fictional geneticists
Fictional gladiators
Fictional illeists
Fictional physicians
Fictional nuclear physicists
Fictional patricides
Fictional vegan and vegetarian characters
Fictional warlords
Horror comics
Marvel Comics male superheroes
Male characters in film
Marvel Comics adapted into films
Marvel Comics adapted into video games
Marvel Comics American superheroes
Marvel Comics characters who can move at superhuman speeds
Marvel Comics characters with accelerated healing
Marvel Comics characters with superhuman strength
Marvel Comics characters who are shapeshifters
Marvel Comics film characters
Marvel Comics mutates
Marvel Comics scientists
Marvel Comics television characters
Marvel Comics titles
Superheroes with alter egos